Pontinus furcirhinus, one of a number of species known as the "red scorpionfish", is a species of marine ray-finned fish belonging to the family Scorpaenidae, the scorpionfishes. It is found in the eastern Pacific Ocean.

Taxonomy
Pontinus furcirhinus was first formally described in 1899 by the American zoologist Samuel Garman with the type locality given as northeast of the Galápagos Islands. The specific name furcirhinus is a compound of furcatus which means “forked” and  rhinus meaning “snout”, an allusion to the forked appearance of the upper jaw caused by the large patches of teeth.

Description
Pontinus furcirhinus has a comparatively thin compressed body which has a depth of 31-38% of its standard length; the body widens with age. The nape is flat and there is no occipital pit to the rear of its large eyes. Some individuals have a slender, pointed cirrus over the eye. The mouth has teeth on its roof and on the sides but none in the front. There are 12 spines in the dorsal fin, the third spine is highly elongated, as well as 8-9 soft rays with the last ray being divided at its based and is detached from the body. The anal fin has 3 spines and 4 soft rays. There is thick glandular tissue on rear margin of fin spines which are though to produce venom. The overall colour is reddish, of varying shades, mottled with white and dark brown and olive spots on their upper body. The caudal fin and the soft spined part of the dorsal fin are densely spotted with small dark oblong spots.

Distributuion and habitat
Pontinus furcirhinus is found in the eastern Pacific Ocean from southern Baja California and the western and southern Gulf of California south to Peru. It has been recorded from Cocos Island and Malpelo Island and the northern Galápagos Islands.

Biology
Pontinus furcirhinus is a predator of mobile benthic crustaceans, cephalopods and bony fishes. It is frequently encountered in large schools.

References

furcirhinus
Fish of Mexican Pacific coast
Western Central American coastal fauna
Fish of Colombia
Fish of Ecuador
Galápagos Islands coastal fauna
Fish described in 1899
Taxa named by Samuel Garman